The Mango Promenade Historic District is a U.S. historic district (designated as such on July 8, 1999) located in West Palm Beach, Florida. The district is bounded by South Dixie Highway, Austin Lane, Coconut Lane, and Cranesnest Way. It contains 125 historic buildings.

References

External links
 Palm Beach County listings at National Register of Historic Places

National Register of Historic Places in Palm Beach County, Florida
Historic districts on the National Register of Historic Places in Florida
West Palm Beach, Florida
Historic districts in Palm Beach County, Florida